Ingrid Gunilla "Nilla" Lundberg (born 6 February 1957) is a retired Swedish swimmer who won a bronze medal at the 1974 European Aquatics Championships. She competed in four freestyle and backstroke events at the 1976 Summer Olympics with the best achievement of seventh place in the 4 × 100 m freestyle relay.

References

External links
Gunilla Lundberg (Rasmusson). Sveriges Olympiska Kommitté

1957 births
Swedish female backstroke swimmers
Swimmers at the 1976 Summer Olympics
Living people
Olympic swimmers of Sweden
European Aquatics Championships medalists in swimming
Swedish female freestyle swimmers
Sportspeople from Umeå